Events from the year 1750 in Ireland.

Incumbent
Monarch: George II

Events
At about this date, a chocolate house, the predecessor of Daly's Club, is established in Dublin.
Captain Henry Delamain takes over the World's End Pottery in Dublin, bringing his expertise in the manufacture of Delftware.

Births
7 February – Thomas McCord, businessman and politician in Lower Canada (died 1824)
24 July – John Philpot Curran, orator and wit, lawyer and MP (died 1817)
Full date unknown
John Connolly, second bishop of the Roman Catholic diocese of New York (died 1825)

Deaths
29 July – Laetitia Pilkington, poet and memoirist (born c. 1709)
 Seamus McMurphy, poet and outlaw (born 1720)

References

 
Years of the 18th century in Ireland
Ireland
1750s in Ireland